Josephine Wood (née Karslake; born 15 March 1955) is an English model, television personality, and entrepreneur. She is the former wife of The Rolling Stones guitarist Ronnie Wood. She accompanied him regularly on tour, looking after his diet.

Wood has travelled the world, and has lived in Los Angeles, New York and is now settled in London. When living in New York, Wood designed clothes for the fashion label No Scruples. Wood published her autobiography, Hey Jo, in February 2013.

Early life
Born Josephine Karslake, Wood was born on 15 March 1955 in Essex to Rachel (née Lundell), who is South African by birth, and Michael Karslake. Her father was an architectural model maker, and her mother was an Avon lady and a doll maker. She is the oldest of four children. She has a sister, Lize, and two brothers, Vinnie and Paul.

Wood worked as a model until she was 22 and was The Sun's "Face of 1972".

Family
In 1973, Wood eloped with Peter Greene in Las Vegas. They had a son, Jamie, in September 1974. They divorced in 1976.

She met Ronnie Wood in 1977. They married on 2 January 1985. They have two children together, Leah (22 September 1978) and Tyrone (21 August 1983). Jameson (Jamie) was adopted by Ronnie and Jo helped raise Jesse, Ronnie's son from his marriage to Krissy Findlay. She and Ronnie Wood divorced in 2009.

Wood has ten grandchildren: Four from Jameson (Jamie), two from Leah, and four from Jesse.

Jo Wood Organics
Following a serious illness in 1989, Wood began to follow a strictly organic lifestyle. In 2005 she launched her own range of organic fragrance, bath and body care products, Jo Wood Organics.

Strictly Come Dancing
In 2009, she partnered Brendan Cole in the BBC show Strictly Come Dancing. The duo was eliminated in Week 6 of the competition when they received 14/40 for their samba.

Charity

Jo Wood supports various charities. In January 2009 she went to Bangladesh with the People Tree Foundation to support the production of ethical and fair-trade fashion, and in August 2010 she made the pilgrimage to the sacred Mount Kailash in Tibet with Sadhguru Jaggi Vasudev writing features for National Geographic Green and Hello! Magazine. Wood also visited Sadhguru's Project GreenHands initiative in India which plants trees to help combat the effects of climate change.

Wood has taken to the catwalk two years running for Naomi Campbell's Fashion for Relief in support of the White Ribbon Alliance.

In 2009 she worked alongside daughter Leah to promote 18 Degrees of Inspiration for climate change charity Global Cool. In the same year she also joined the 10:10 project, a movement that encourages people to reduce their carbon emissions.

Mrs. Paisley's Lashings
In 2009, Wood set up her own pop up restaurant 'Mrs. Paisley's Lashings' with the UK eco chef Arthur Potts Dawson. The restaurant was set up in Wood's house with her aim to promote sustainable dining and green living. All food is grown in Wood's garden, and locally sourced where possible. From each restaurant, Wood donates profits to a 'Gardens in Schools Scheme' she set up to help children understand where their food comes from.

Television appearances

Wood makes regular appearances on television, which have included Strictly Come Dancing, Heston's Feast, Mary Queen of Shops, Britain's Got More Talent, Market Kitchen and Who's Doing the Dishes. In July 2013, Wood appeared on the television show Celebrity MasterChef, where she was the second contestant to be eliminated. She has also appeared on Celebrity First Dates and The Island.

Wood writes editorial columns in Fabulous & Natural Health magazine and has written a book ' How to Look and Feel Healthy, Energetic and Radiant the Organic Way'.

Alien Nation Podcast
Wood is an avid believer in aliens and UFOs since seeing strange lights in the sky in Brazil in 1998. On her "Alien Nation Podcast" she talks to other celebrities and members of the public who have had close encounters or simply think there are other planets with life in the universe.

Autobiography
On 5 November 2019, Wood released her autobiography Stoned: Photographs & treasures from life with the Rolling Stones.

References

 

Living people
1955 births
People from Essex
English female models
English businesspeople
English autobiographers
English people of South African descent
Women autobiographers